Frances Sarah Adcock (born 9 August 1984) is a British-born Australian former competition swimmer who specialized in backstroke events. 

Adcock was born in Nottingham, England.  She moved to Adelaide, South Australia in her teenage years, where she worked as a resident athlete and a varsity player for the Western Sharks and Norwood Swimming Club. 

Adcock is a three-time short-course Australian champion in the 200m backstroke breaking the Australian record for the event at the 2008 World SC Championship trials. Adcock qualified for the women's 200-metre backstroke at the 2004 Summer Olympics in Athens, by attaining both her personal record and an A-standard entry time of 2:13.48 from the Telstra Olympic Swimming Trials in Sydney. In the morning's preliminary heats, Adcock secured a fifteenth overall spot for the next round, with a time of 2:14.85. On the evening session, however, Adcock fell short in her bid for the final, as she finished the semifinal run, with the slowest time of 2:15.69, more than two seconds behind her teammate Melissa Morgan.

Adcock retired from swimming to pursue her career as a sports and news journalist for ABC Wide Bay in Queensland.

Adcock contributes to national ABC programs 'The World Today' and 'AM'.

She has two degrees in Journalism and International Studies.

References

External links
Profile – Australian Olympic Team

1984 births
Living people
British emigrants to Australia
Australian female backstroke swimmers
Naturalised citizens of Australia
Olympic swimmers of Australia
Sportspeople from Nottingham
Swimmers at the 2004 Summer Olympics